

Storms
Note:  indicates the name was retired after that usage in the respective basin.

Zack
1992 – a tropical storm that remained over the open western Pacific Ocean
1995 – a Category 4 equivalent typhoon that struck the Philippines and Vietnam, killing 110 people; also known as Pepang within the Philippine Area of Responsibility (PAR)

Zaka
1996 – a weak tropical cyclone that passed near New Caledonia, causing minor damage
2011 – a tropical cyclone that dissipated northeast of New Zealand, causing no damage

Zane
1996 – Category 3 equivalent typhoon that crossed the Ryukyu Islands; also known as Paring within the PAR
2013 – developed and dissipated between Queensland and Papua New Guinea

Zazu (2020) – a tropical cyclone that brought heavy surf to Niue and hurricane-force wind gusts to Tonga, but caused no significant damage

Zeb (1998) – a Category 5 equivalent typhoon that killed 122 people when it struck Luzon; also known as Iliang within the PAR

Zelia
1998 – a tropical cyclone that developed near Cocos Islands
2011 – severe tropical cyclone that brought heavy rainfall to New Zealand as an extratropical cyclone

Zeke
1991 – passed over the Philippines before hitting Hainan; also known as Etang within the PAR
1992 – a tropical storm off the coast of southwestern Mexico
1994 – a typhoon that remained east of Japan

Zelda
1991 – a severe tropical storm that caused damage in the Marshall Islands
1994 – Category 4 super typhoon that passed over the Northern Mariana Islands during its circuitous track through the western Pacific Ocean; also known as Esang within the PAR

Zena (2016) – a Category 2 tropical cyclone that passed near Fiji

Zeta
2005 – an end-of-the-year storm that remained out at sea; one of only two Atlantic tropical cyclones on record to span two calendar years
2020 – a Category 3 hurricane that made landfall on the Yucatán Peninsula and then in southeastern Louisiana

Zia (1999) – a tropical storm that moved across Japan, killing nine

Zigzag (2003) – a tropical storm that made landfall in northeastern Mindanao; deemed a tropical depression by the Japan Meteorological Agency

Zita
1997 –  was a short-lived tropical cyclone that killed seven people in southern China, and caused damage in both Chia and Vietnam, where there was additional loss of life; also known as Luming within the PAR

2007 – a tropical cyclone that passed through French Polynesia

Zoe
1974 – a severe tropical cyclone that moved along the coast of Queensland
2002 – a Category 5 severe tropical cyclone, and one of the strongest South Pacific tropical cyclones on record in terms atmospheric pressure, that affected the Solomon Islands, Fiji, Vanuatu, and Rotuma

Zola
1990 – a Category 3 equivalent typhoon that struck Japan, killing 3 people
1993 – a severe tropical storm that made landfall in Japan; also known as Unsing within the PAR

Zoraida (2013) – a storm that affected the Philippines and Vietnam; also known as Podul beyond the PAR

Zorbas (2018) – a Mediterranean tropical-like cyclone that reached Category 1 equivalent strength

Zosimo (2004) – a tropical storm that moved through the Marshall Islands and the Federated States of Micronesia; also known as Talas beyond the PAR

Zuman
1987 – a short-lived and weak storm that churned in the open South Pacific
1998 – a Category 3 severe tropical cyclone that struck Espiritu Santo

See also

European windstorm names
Atlantic hurricane season
Pacific hurricane season
Tropical cyclone naming
South Atlantic tropical cyclone
Tropical cyclone

References
General

 
 
 
 
 
 
 
 
 
 
 
 
 
 
 
 
 

 
 
 
 
 

Z